Raymond Troye (1908–2003) was a Belgian officer and writer, born in Charleroi. During his imprisonment in Nazi Germany he wrote 5 novels of which two were published after the war.

As a young lieutenant in the Belgian army, he was captured by the German army in May 1940. He spent a few days in the transit camp of Dortmund after which he is sent to a camp in Bavaria (Oflag VII-B) where he remained for two years before being transferred to another camp close to Hamburg (Oflag XD). He spent the two last years of the war in a camp located in the north of Berlin (Oflag II-A).

Bibliography
 R. Troye, Meurtre dans un Oflag, Les Editions Atalante, Bruxelles, 1947
 R. Troye, Le Pharmacien de Chantenelle, Les Editions Atalante, Bruxelles, 1947

Sources
 Raymond Troye (French)

1908 births
2003 deaths
Walloon people
Belgian soldiers
Belgian prisoners of war in World War II
Belgian writers in French